Glenrothes Football Club is a Scottish football club based in the new town of Glenrothes, Fife. Their strip colours are red with white trim.

History
Formed in May 1964 with assistance from the Glenrothes Development Corporation,  the "Glens" played their first game against near neighbours Thornton Hibs in August the same year at their original Dovecot Park ground. A crowd of 5,400 attended a Scottish Junior Cup quarter-final tie against Shotts Bon Accord here during Glenrothes' run to the final in 1968.

The club moved to the purpose built Warout Stadium in 1971, one of the larger grounds in junior football, with room for around 5,000 spectators, 730 of whom can be seated. The record attendance for this ground is 5,600 against Cambuslang Rangers in another Junior Cup quarter-final tie in 1974.

Glenrothes' greatest success as a club came in 1975 when they won the Scottish Junior Cup, defeating Rutherglen Glencairn 1–0,  in front of a crowd of 17,776 at Hampden Park. Glens had also been runners-up in 1968, losing after a replay to Johnstone Burgh with a combined attendance of 50,000 over the two ties, an impressive achievement given that they had only been formed a mere four years beforehand.

The club were members of the Fife Junior League, before competing in the East Region of which they, along with all Fife junior clubs became a part of in 2002. They were relegated from the East Super League (the top division in their region) in season 2005–06, but they immediately returned after clinching the 2006–07 Premier League title and remained in the top tier for three seasons.

In March 2019, Glenrothes announced they had applied for membership of the East of Scotland Football League beginning in the 2019–20 season, and were later accepted into the league. As part of the club's move to senior football, its name was changed to reflect this, by dropping the term "Junior".

Current Players

Callum Kinnes
Lea Schiavone
Conor Schiavone
Lewis Grierson
Blair Smart
Stuart Cargill
Charlie Denton
Ryan McKinnes
James Collins
Adam Shaw
Brandon Connor
Craig Wallace
Michael Gibb
Cammy Lumsden
Greame Walker
Fionn Mcleod Kay
Kyle Bell
Dylan Honeyman
Reece Brown

Honours

Scottish Junior Cup
Winners: 1974–75
Runners-up: 1967–68

SJFA East Region Premier League
Champions: 2006–07

Other Honours
Fife & Lothians (Heineken) Cup: 1971–72
Fife Junior League winners: 1965–66, 1966–67, 1967–68, 1969–70, 1970–71, 1974–75, 1975–76, 1977–78, 1983–84, 1984–85
Fife Junior (PSM) Cup: 1967–68, 1970–71, 1971–72, 1972–73, 1975–76, 1976–77, 1978–79, 1985–86, 1997–98, 1999–00, 2000–01, 2003–04
Fife & Tayside Cup: 2008–09
Cowdenbeath (Interbrew) Cup: 1969–70, 1971–72, 1972–73, 1973–74, 1976–77, 1977–78, 1983–84
Kingdom Kegs Cup: 1996–97, 1998–99, 2001–02, 2003–04, 2007–08
Laidlaw Shield winners: 1981–82, 1982–83
ACA sports League Cup: 2009–10
Scottish record holders for best goal difference in a season, + 133 (32 games), 1969-70 Fife Region Junior League

References

External links
 Official club site

Football clubs in Scotland
Scottish Junior Football Association clubs
East of Scotland Football League teams
Association football clubs established in 1964
Football clubs in Fife
1964 establishments in Scotland
Glenrothes